Birdland is a studio album by the reconstituted English rock group the Yardbirds, which was released in 2003, and the band's fifth studio album overall. Original drummer Jim McCarty and rhythm guitarist Chris Dreja reformed the group in 1994 and, for the album, the Yardbirds lineup included lead singer and bassist John Idan, lead guitarist Gypie Mayo, and harmonica player Alan Glen. The album features contributions by several guests, including Joe Satriani, Steve Vai, Slash, Brian May, and original group guitarist Jeff Beck.

The album contains seven new originals, composed mainly by McCarty or Dreja, and eight remakes of classic Yardbirds songs from the 1960s. The song "An Original Man (A Song for Keith)" was dedicated to Keith Relf, original Yardbirds singer who died in 1976.

Birdland reached number 25 on Billboard's Independent Albums chart in the US and number 67 in Germany.

Critical reception
In a review for AllMusic, critic Richie Unterberger gave the album two out of five stars. He noted that while the new lineup cannot be compared to the original, it "is a lot better than you'd expect, and certainly far more respectable than most reunion/comeback efforts by decimated lineups of classic outfits". He added that the remakes of some of the classic Yardbirds songs are "not done badly, though you feel as though you're listening to a really good Yardbirds tribute band rather than the real deal".

Jason McNeil, in a review for PopMatters, wrote: "Perhaps the greatest thing the group has going for it is sounding contemporary without sounding like your run-of-the-mill roadhouse covers band". In going through the album's songs, he praises the remakes of "I'm Not Talking" and "The Nazz Are Blue", but faults those of "Train Kept a Rollin'" and "Over Under Sideways Down".

Dan Forte, writing for Vintage Guitar magazine, believed that McCarty and Dreja were still very strong performers and that new member Gypie Mayo's (formerly guitarist with Dr. Feelgood) "blues roots and over-the-top daring are the perfect combination". He also identified the remakes of "Mister, You're a Better Man Than I" with Brian May on guitar and "Happenings Ten Years Time Ago" with Steve Lukather as "the best cameos".

Track listing

Personnel
The Yardbirds
 Chris Dreja – rhythm guitar
 Alan Glen – harmonica, percussion
 John Idan – bass guitar, lead vocals
 Gypie Mayo – lead guitar
 Jim McCarty – drums, percussion, vocals

Additional musicians
 Jeff "Skunk" Baxter – guitar
 Jeff Beck – guitar
 Steve Lukather – guitar
 Brian May – guitar
 Joe Satriani – guitar
 Slash – guitar
 Steve Vai – guitar
 Johnny Rzeznikguitar and backing vocal
 Martin Ditchamadditional percussion

References

2003 albums
Favored Nations albums
The Yardbirds albums